Uroskinnera is a genus of flowering plants belonging to the family Plantaginaceae. It is also in Tribe Cheloneae.

It is native to Mexico, Guatemala and El Salvador.

Known species
Accepted by Kew:
 Uroskinnera almedae T.F.Daniel & D.E.Breedlove 
 Uroskinnera flavida Lundell 
 Uroskinnera hirtiflora Hemsl. 
 Uroskinnera spectabilis Lindl.

The genus name of Uroskinnera is in honour of George Ure Skinner (1804–1867), an English merchant, ornithologist and plant collector. 
It was first described and published in Gard. Chron. 1857 on page 36 in 1857. The genus is recognized by the United States Department of Agriculture and the Agricultural Research Service, but they do not list any known species.

References

Plantaginaceae
Plantaginaceae genera
Plants described in 1845
Flora of Mexico
Flora of Guatemala
Flora of El Salvador